The Asociación Deportiva de Fútbol Profesional, commonly known as the ADFP, is a Peruvian football governing body that organizes the Primera División. The association is made up of 9 current clubs.

The first governing body to congregate football clubs in Peru was the Liga Peruana de Football (Peruvian Football League) which was founded on 12 May 1912. The league organized its first season in 1912 with 16 clubs from Lima divided into two divisions but was discontinued after the end of the 1921 season.

The first division was subsequently organized by the Peruvian Football Federation in 1926 which was founded in 1922 and became a member of CONMEBOL in 1925. Starting in 1941, the organization of the Primera División was passed from the Peruvian Football Federation to the newly formed Asociación No Amateur (Non-Amateur Association). This organization was replaced by the Asociación Central de Fútbol (Central Football Association) in 1951 when the Primera División became a professional league. Finally, in 1962, the ADFP succeeded the Asociación Central de Fútbol as the organizing body of the first division.

List of Peruvian football champions

Peruvian football had amateur status since its foundation until 1950. In the course of this era, Alianza Lima, Atlético Chalaco, Municipal, Sport Boys, and Universitario de Deportes shared the most titles. The first run from 1912 to 1921 featured clubs only from Lima under the Liga Peruana de Football. In 1926 and 1927 two unofficial tournaments were played. In 1928 the first championship official expanded to Callao under the Peruvian Football Federation. In 1936 no tournament took place, however an unofficial tournament were played, where Universitario and Alianza Lima  were champion and runner-up respectively.

Amateur league (1912–1950)
Peruvian football had amateur status since its foundation until 1950. In the course of this era, Alianza Lima, Atlético Chalaco, Municipal, Sport Boys, and Universitario de Deportes shared the most titles. The first run from 1912 to 1921 featured clubs only from Lima under the Liga Peruana de Football. In 1926 and 1927 two unofficial tournaments were played. In 1928 the first championship official expanded to Callao under the Peruvian Football Federation. In 1936 no tournament took place, however an unofficial tournament were played, where Universitario and Alianza Lima  were champion and runner-up respectively.

Professional league (1951–present)
In 1951 the league obtained professional status and in 1966 expanded the league to the entire nation, beginning the Descentralizado.

See also
List of Peruvian football champions

References

External links
  
 Peruvian Football Federation

Football in Peru
Sports governing bodies in Peru